Miss Venezuela 1967 was the 14th edition of Miss Venezuela pageant held at Teatro de la Academia Militar in Caracas, Venezuela, on June 15, 1967, after weeks of events. The winner of the pageant was Mariela Pérez Branger, Miss Departamento Vargas.

The pageant was broadcast live by RCTV.

Results
Miss Venezuela 1967 - Mariela Pérez Branger (Miss Departamento Vargas)
1st runner-up - Irene Bottger (Miss Bolívar)
2nd runner-up - Ingrid Goecke (Miss Zulia)
3rd runner-up - Eunice De Lima (Miss Apure)
4th runner-up - Minerva Salas (Miss Anzoátegui)

Special awards
 Miss Cordialidad (Miss Cordiality) - Clara Morales (Miss Distrito Federal)
 Miss Sonrisa (Best Smile) - Bertha Piña (Miss Lara)

Delegates

 Miss Anzoátegui - Minerva Salas Aguinagalde
 Miss Apure - Eunice De Lima Molina
 Miss Aragua - Maria Elena Maldonado
 Miss Bolívar - Irene Bottger González
 Miss Carabobo - Raquel D'Vivo
 Miss Caracas - Bárbara Kowalsky
 Miss Departamento Vargas - Mariela Pérez Branger
 Miss Distrito Federal - Clara Morales Curiel
 Miss Lara - Bertha Piña Montes
 Miss Mérida - Lala Lydia Tyjouck
 Miss Miranda - Johanna Lozada Bermúdez
 Miss Monagas - Mayela Livinalli Matamoros
 Miss Nueva Esparta - Janeth Adams Rosales
 Miss Sucre - Dorkys Yánez Arévalo
 Miss Yaracuy - Ivonne Sosa Vásquez
 Miss Zulia - Ingrid Goecke Briceño

External links
Miss Venezuela official website

1967 beauty pageants
1967 in Venezuela